Rosemary Clooney Sings Ballads is a 1985 album by Rosemary Clooney.

Track listing
 "Thanks for the Memory" (Ralph Rainger, Leo Robin) – 5:00
 "Here's That Rainy Day" (Johnny Burke, Jimmy Van Heusen) – 3:41
 "The Shadow of Your Smile" (Johnny Mandel, Paul Francis Webster) – 5:28
 "A Nightingale Sang in Berkeley Square" (Eric Maschwitz, Manning Sherwin, Jack Strachey) – 3:13
 "Bewitched, Bothered and Bewildered" (Lorenz Hart, Richard Rodgers) – 4:33
 "Days of Wine and Roses" (Henry Mancini, Johnny Mercer) – 4:04
 "Easy Living" (Rainger, Robin) – 4:26
 "Spring Is Here" (Hart, Rodgers) – 3:29
 "Why Shouldn't I?" (Cole Porter) – 4:47
 "It Never Entered My Mind" (Hart, Rodgers) – 4:10

Personnel
 Rosemary Clooney – vocals
 Warren Vaché Jr. – cornet
 Scott Hamilton – tenor saxophone
 John Oddo – piano
 Ed Bickert – guitar
 Chris Flory – guitar 
 Chuck Israels – double bass
 Jake Hanna – drums

References

1985 albums
Rosemary Clooney albums
Concord Records albums